Eckington School is a very large comprehensive school in Eckington, Derbyshire in England, next to the B6056 road. It has around 1,250 pupils. As of the term beginning 9 April 2018 the school is part of the LEAP Multi Academy Trust currently, as of December 2022 the school will move to Chorus trust.

History
Previous to the opening of the school, there was the Eckington County Secondary School, which opened in Halfway (in Derbyshire before 1967) in 1930, and became the Eckington Grammar School in 1945. In Eckington was also the Eckington Secondary Modern School on School Street; when the grammar school became Derbyshire's first comprehensive school - the Westfield School - in 1957, this became Eckington Junior School. The current site started construction in 1978 and opened to students a few years later in 1983

Admissions
The school catchment area includes surrounding areas such as Killamarsh, Renishaw, Beighton, Ridgeway and Mosborough. Despite the school being closer to several Sheffield residential areas (including Beighton and Mosborough) than other Derbyshire ones, the admissions policy is set in such a way to favour pupils coming from the Derbyshire feeder schools in areas such as Killamarsh, Ridgeway and Renishaw. This is because most students from the Mosborough and Beighton area attend Westfield School.

Academic performance
Eckington Comprehensive was designated a specialist engineering college. This title was removed from the school. Students attain results that are well above average at GCSE for Derbyshire (94% 5 A* - C, 63% including English and Maths in 2012). The results at A level were better than average.

In June 2022, the school was given an "Inadequate" rating by Ofsted.

Notable former pupils
 Chris Pritchard 1999, Represented Scotland at 2010 Commonwealth Games Track Cycling
 Mat Welsh, Sean Long, Aaran McKenzie and Adam Savage from the band While She Sleeps
 Millie Bright, footballer
 Ruth Amos, entrepreneur and inventor
 Adam Duffy, ex-professional snooker player

References

External links
 Eckington School
 EduBase

Educational institutions established in 1978
Secondary schools in Derbyshire
1978 establishments in England
Academies in Derbyshire
Eckington, Derbyshire